Saint-Alexandre is a municipality in the province of Quebec, Canada, located in the Regional County Municipality of Le Haut-Richelieu. The population as of the Canada 2011 Census was 2,495. Residents of Saint-Alexandre are called Alexandrins (Alexandrines, fem.).

History
Saint-Alexandre was named for Alexander, bishop of Alexandria from 313 to 328, who was succeeded by Athanasius.

Demographics
Population

Language

See also
List of municipalities in Quebec

References

External links

 Saint-Alexandre official website

Municipalities in Quebec
Incorporated places in Le Haut-Richelieu Regional County Municipality